Butson Ridge is a rocky ridge with a number of ice-covered summits, the highest at , forming the north wall of Northeast Glacier on the west coast of Graham Land. It was first surveyed in 1936 by the British Graham Land Expedition under John Rymill. It was resurveyed in 1946–48 by the Falkland Islands Dependencies Survey (FIDS) and named for Dr. Arthur R.C. Butson, FIDS medical officer at Stonington Island, who in July 1947 rescued a member of the Ronne Antarctic Research Expedition from a crevasse in Northeast Glacier.

References
 

Ridges of Graham Land
Fallières Coast